The Iquitos Metropolitan Area is the name used to refer to the Peruvian metropolitan area whose principal city is Iquitos, according to Municipality of Iquitos. According to population statistics of INEI It is the sixth most populous metropolitan area of Peru in year 2015.

Metropolitan districts 

According to studies of municipality of Maynas Iquitos metropolitan area consist in four districts: Iquitos, Belén, Punchana and San Juan Bautista. The estimated population of INEI for the metropolitan districts in year 2015 is shown in the following table.

See also 
 Maynas Province
 List of metropolitan areas of Peru
 Peru

References

Metropolitan areas of Peru